Zhang Dinghua (June 1933 – 25 January 2021) was a Chinese politician who served as first secretary of Secretariat of the All-China Federation of Trade Unions from 1991 to 1998.

He was a representative of the 13th, 14th, and 15th National Congress of the Chinese Communist Party. He was a member of the 14th and 15th Central Committee of the Chinese Communist Party. He was a member of the Standing Committee of the 9th and 10th National People's Congress.

Biography
Zhang was born in Shaan County (now Shanzhou District of Sanmenxia), Henan, in June 1933. He secondary studied at the Xi'an Middle School of Shaanxi Province. In 1951, he entered Northwest University, majoring in Russian language.

In 1955, he was admitted to the China University of Petroleum, majoring in petroleum geology. He joined the Chinese Communist Party (CCP) in March 1956. In 1956, he was sent to the Qaidam Basin in northwest China to explore for oil, and was transferred to Shengli Oil Field in east China's Shandong province in 1964. In 1966, the Cultural Revolution broke out, he forced to work in oil fields but later reinstated in 1970. 

In June 1983, he was promoted to party secretary of Dagang Petroleum Administration Bureau, the top political position in the bureau.

Zhang was appointed head of the Publicity Department of CCP Tianjin Municipal Committee and secretary of the CCP Tianjin Municipal Commission for Discipline Inspection in October 1985 and was admitted to member of the Standing Committee of the CCP Tianjin Municipal Committee, the city's top authority.

He was appointed deputy party secretary of Inner Mongolia in April 1988, concurrently serving as president of the regional party school.

He became vice chairperson of the All-China Federation of Trade Unions and first secretary of its Secretariat in December 1991, and served until October 1998.

In December 1998, he took office as vice chairperson of the National People's Congress Supervisory and Judicial Affairs Committee. He retired in September 2009.

On 25 January 2021, he died from an illness in Beijing, at the age of 87.

References

1933 births
2021 deaths
People from Sanmenxia
Northwest University (China) alumni
China University of Petroleum alumni
People's Republic of China politicians from Henan
Chinese Communist Party politicians from Henan
Members of the Standing Committee of the 9th National People's Congress
Members of the Standing Committee of the 10th National People's Congress
Members of the 14th Central Committee of the Chinese Communist Party
Members of the 15th Central Committee of the Chinese Communist Party